Shaheed Davis (born February 14, 1994) is an American professional basketball player for Anorthosis Ammohostou of the Cyprus Basketball Division A. He graduated from the University of Central Florida, where he played for the UCF Knights men's basketball team from 2014 to 2016.

Professional career
After graduating from UCF Knights in 2016, on July 28, 2016, he signed with Sheffield Sharks.

On 24 February 2017, Davis agreed terms with Academic Plovdiv.

On 20 August 2017, he signed with Macedonian basketball club Feni Industries. In 4 games for Feni Industries, he averaged 27.8 points and 12.3 rebounds.

On November 2, 2017, he signed with Cherkaski Mavpy.

On January 26, 2018 he was awarded the Ukrainian Superleage All Star MVP award after scoring 34 points, 8 rebounds, 6 assists and 4 steals.

On June 13, 2018, Davis signed with the Italian basketball club Pallacanestro Cantù of the LBA.

In 2021, Davis joined Hapoel Eilat of the Israeli League. 

On December 24, 2021, he signed with  Alba Fehérvár of the Nemzeti Bajnokság I/A.

On October 6, 2022, Davis signed with Greek club Lavrio, replacing Kevion Taylor.

On December 15, 2022, Davis signed with the Tainan TSG GhostHawks of the T1 League. On January 13, 2023, Tainan TSG GhostHawks terminated the contract relationship with Davis.

On March 1, 2023, Davis signed with Anorthosis Ammohostou of the Cyprus Basketball Division A.

The Basketball Tournament
Davis joined War Tampa, a team composed primarily of Auburn alumni in The Basketball Tournament 2020. He scored seven points in a 76–53 loss to House of 'Paign in the first round.

References

External links
Eurobasket.com Profile
RealGM Profile
UFC Knights bio
ESPN Profile
247Sports Profile

1994 births
Living people
American expatriate basketball people in Bulgaria
American expatriate basketball people in Greece
American expatriate basketball people in Hungary
American expatriate basketball people in Iraq
American expatriate basketball people in Italy
American expatriate basketball people in Japan
American expatriate basketball people in North Macedonia
American expatriate basketball people in Ukraine
American expatriate basketball people in the United Kingdom
American men's basketball players
Basketball players from Ohio
BC Cherkaski Mavpy players
Eastern Florida State College people
Fukushima Firebonds players
Junior college men's basketball players in the United States
Kumamoto Volters players
Lavrio B.C. players
Lega Basket Serie A players
Pallacanestro Cantù players
Polk State College alumni
Power forwards (basketball)
Sheffield Sharks players
Sportspeople from Warren, Ohio
UCF Knights men's basketball players
Tainan TSG GhostHawks players
T1 League imports